The Second ministry of Manik Saha is the council of ministers headed by Chief Minister Manik Saha, which was formed after 2023 Tripura Legislative Assembly election which was held in 16 February in the state. The results were declared on 2 March and this led to formation of 13th Tripura Assembly.

Manik Saha is the leader of Bharatiya Janata Party who is sworn as the Chief Ministers of Tripura on 08 March 2023, which led to the formation of his ministry for the second time and the current Government of Tripura. He was administered the oath by Governor Satyadev Narayan Arya in presence of the Prime Minister of India Narendra Modi, Home Minister Amit Shah, BJP National president J. P. Nadda at Swami Vivekananda Stadium in Agartala.

The Bharatiya Janata Party-led NDA secured a comfortable majority in Tripura winning 32 seats of the total 60 constituencies. While BJP secured 32 seats, its allies IPFT 1 seats respectively.

Council of Ministers

 As in March 2023

Demography of Council of Ministers

References

Lists of current Indian state and territorial ministries
Tripura ministries
Bharatiya Janata Party state ministries
2023 in Indian politics